Henry Fitzalan-Howard, 15th Duke of Norfolk,  (27 December 184711 February 1917), styled Lord Maltravers until 1856 and Earl of Arundel and Surrey between 1856 and 1860, was a British Unionist politician and philanthropist. He served as Postmaster General between 1895 and 1900, but is best remembered for his philanthropic work, which concentrated on Roman Catholic causes and the city of Sheffield.

Background
Norfolk was the eldest son of Henry Fitzalan-Howard, 14th Duke of Norfolk, and Augusta Mary Minna Catherine, younger daughter of Edmund Lyons, 1st Baron Lyons. Edmund Fitzalan-Howard, 1st Viscount Fitzalan of Derwent, was his younger brother. The Duke was first educated at The Oratory School, but owing to restrictions from the Catholic Hierarchy he was unable to attend either Oxford or Cambridge Universities. His higher education instead consisted of a Grand Tour of Europe around 1867 under the guidance of classical scholar and biographer Robert Ornsby.

Public career
Norfolk succeeded to the dukedom at the age of 12 on the death of his father on 25 November 1860. He also succeeded to the hereditary office of Earl Marshal held by the Dukes of Norfolk.

On 5 April 1871 he was commissioned as Captain in the part-time 9th (Arundel) Sussex Rifle Volunteer Corps, which had been raised by his father just before his death. He was promoted to Major in the 2nd Sussex Rifle Volunteers on 4 March 1882.

In 1895, he was sworn of the Privy Council and appointed Postmaster General by Lord Salisbury, a post he held until early 1900, when he resigned in order to serve in the Boer War. In 1895 he also became Mayor of Sheffield; serving two terms during which he arranged the city's monumental celebrations in honour of Queen Victoria's Diamond Jubilee in 1897. Shortly thereafter he was appointed the first Lord Mayor of Sheffield, but retained the office only until November 1897. He was appointed an honorary Freeman of the City of Sheffield three years later, in March 1900. In November 1900 he became the first Mayor of Westminster.

Aged 53, he went in 1900 to South Africa for service in the Second Boer War as a lieutenant colonel in the Imperial Yeomanry, in the course of which he was wounded near Pretoria and invalided back to Britain. After the end of the war he was promoted to Lieutenant-Colonel Commandant of his volunteer battalion (now the 2nd Volunteer Battalion, Royal Sussex Regiment) on 24 December 1902, and chaired the Royal Commission on Militia and Volunteers that was established in 1903. The commission attempted to define the role of the auxiliary forces, and made detailed proposals on how their deficiencies in training and equipment could be addressed. 

Norfolk's commission proposed a Home Defence Army raised by conscription, which was unpopular with the Volunteers and Yeomanry, and was quickly shelved. However, in conjunction with the Elgin Commission on the War in South Africa, the Norfolk Commission's work influenced the creation of the Territorial Force (TF) under the 1908 Haldane Reforms, which subsumed the old Volunteer Force. He retired from command of the 4th Battalion, Royal Sussex Regiment (as the battalion had become in the TF) in 1913 after 42 years' service.

In his capacity as Earl Marshal the duke arranged the state funerals of William Ewart Gladstone (1898), Queen Victoria (1901), and King Edward VII (1910), and the coronations of Edward VII (1902) and George V (1911).

Apart from serving as Earl Marshal between 1860 and 1917, Norfolk was Lord Lieutenant of Sussex between 1905 and 1917.

He was made a Knight of the Garter in 1886, and received the Knight Grand Cross of the Royal Victorian Order (GCVO) from King Edward VII on 11 August 1902, following the King's coronation two days earlier.

He was three-time chairman of the National Union of Conservative Associations, grand chancellor of the Primrose League, and commanding officer of the 4th (Volunteer) Battalion Royal Sussex Regiment.

Philanthropy and Religious Work
[[File:StEdmund'sCrest.png|thumb|Arms of St Edmund's College, Cambridge: Arms of the founder Henry Fitzalan-Howard, 15th Duke of Norfolk (quarterly of four: Howard, Brotherton, Warenne, FitzAlan) with a canton of St Edmund of Abingdon (Or, a cross fleury gules between four Cornish choughs proper) all within a bordure argent]]
As is common with the Dukes of Norfolk, but exceptional within the British aristocracy, Norfolk was a Roman Catholic. In his dual role as Premier Duke and most prominent Roman Catholic in England, he undertook a programme of philanthropy which served in part to reintegrate Roman Catholics into civic life. He was born a generation after the Catholic Relief Act 1829 but before the reconstitution of Roman Catholic dioceses in 1850. By the time he came of age as Duke in 1868, the process of Catholic Emancipation had made the establishment of Catholic institutions legal, but the reality of two hundred years of legislation in favour of the Church of England left Roman Catholics with few structures of their own.

Norfolk's first major benefaction commemorated his coming of age as Duke. At his ancestral seat of Arundel Castle (being also one of the Earls of Arundel), he sponsored the construction of the Church of Our Lady and St Philip Neri between 1868 and 1873. This church was later chosen to serve as Arundel Cathedral in 1965 and rededicated in 1971 to include Saint Philip Howard, 20th Earl of Arundel, one of his ancestors.

In 1877, he married his first wife, Lady Flora Hastings. He later wrote, 'Shortly after my most happy marriage, I wished to build a church as a thank-offering to God.' To commemorate this occasion, he undertook the construction of a church in his titular ancestral seat in Norwich, Norfolk. After commencing in 1882 with a gift of £200,000, construction would not be completed until 1910, nearly 23 years after Lady Flora's death in 1887. This church was also later chosen to serve as St John the Baptist Cathedral, Norwich when the Roman Catholic Diocese of East Anglia was re-established in 1976.

In the 1890s Norfolk was instrumental in the campaign that convinced the Vatican authorities to relax its restrictions on Catholic students enrolling at the great English universities, culminating with the co-founding of St Edmund's College, Cambridge along with Baron Anatole von Hugel. He was a significant contributor to the Father Damien fund to fight leprosy. He also donated funds for the building of the University of Sheffield and was its initial Chancellor between 1905 and 1917.

From 1898 on, he edited, together with Charles Tindal Gatty, the hymnal Arundel Hymns'', to which Pope Leo XIII contributed a preface in form of a personal letter.

Family
In 1877, Norfolk married his first wife, Lady Flora Paulyna Hetty Barbara Abney-Hastings (1854–1887), daughter of Charles Abney-Hastings, 1st Baron Donington and Edith Rawdon-Hastings, 10th Countess of Loudoun, in 1877. They had one child:
 
Philip Joseph Mary Fitzalan-Howard, Earl of Surrey, Earl of Arundel (7 September 1879 – 8 July 1902), died unmarried.

After Lady Flora's death from Bright's Disease in April 1887, aged 33, Norfolk remained unmarried for nearly seventeen years.

On 7 February 1904, at age 56, he married, as his second wife, his first cousin once removed, the Hon. Gwendolen Constable-Maxwell, eldest daughter of Marmaduke Constable-Maxwell, 11th Lord Herries of Terregles and the Hon. Angela Mary Charlotte, daughter of Edward Fitzalan-Howard, 1st Baron Howard of Glossop. She was 30 years his junior, and aged 27 at their wedding. They had four children:

Lady Mary Rachel Fitzalan-Howard (27 June 1905 – 17 August 1992) 
Bernard Fitzalan-Howard, 16th Duke of Norfolk (1908–1975)
Lady Katherine Mary Fitzalan-Howard, (Born 1912) married in 1940 Joseph Anthony Moore Phillips. Lady Katherine Phillips was the aunt  of Captain Mark Phillips. She died in 2000.

In 1908 Gwendolen succeeded her father as Lady Herries of Terregles. The Duke of Norfolk died in February 1917, aged 69, and was succeeded in the dukedom by his only surviving son, Bernard. On his death, Lord Curzon  said he was a man "who was diffident about powers which were in excess of the ordinary". The Duchess of Norfolk died in August 1945, aged 68. She was succeeded in the Scottish lordship of parliament by her son, Bernard.

Ancestry

Family tree

References

External links

1847 births
1917 deaths
315
33
306
123
23
Earls Marshal
Henry Fitzalan-Howard, 15th Duke of Norfolk
British Yeomanry officers
Royal Sussex Regiment officers
Catholic Church in Cambridge
English Roman Catholics
Fellows of St Edmund's College, Cambridge
Henry
Knights Grand Cross of the Royal Victorian Order
Knights of the Garter
Lord-Lieutenants of Sussex
Lord Mayors of Sheffield
Mayors of places in Greater London
Members of London County Council
Members of the Privy Council of the United Kingdom
Members of Westminster Metropolitan Borough Council
United Kingdom Postmasters General
Founders of colleges of the University of Cambridge